Piprell Lake is a lake in the Canadian province of Saskatchewan in the boreal forest ecozone of Canada. The lake is located in the Northern Saskatchewan Administration District, just south of the geographical centre of Saskatchewan in the Cub Hills. It is west of the western boundary of Narrow Hills Provincial Park and south-east of Clarence-Steepbank Lakes Provincial Park Piprell Lake Recreation Site and Rainbow Lodge are situated at the northern end of the lake and its amenities are accessed from Highway 913.

Piprell Lake Recreation Site 
Piprell Lake Recreation Site is a provincial recreation area at the northern end of Piprell Lake. The recreation site has a campground, playground, boat launch, central shower and washroom facility, and a grocery store. There is a picnic area and beach access for swimming. Nearby are trails for hiking and ATVing and in the winter, for snowmobiling.

Surrounded by the park is Rainbow Lodge. It has five modern, three to four-bedroom chalets with full plumbing and satellite TV, along with waterfront cabins for rent.

The whole park is well treed and the lake is stocked with fish for angling in the summer and ice fishing in the winter.

Fish species 
Piprell Lake is stocked with tiger trout, splake, and brown trout.

See also 
List of lakes of Saskatchewan
List of protected areas of Saskatchewan
Tourism in Saskatchewan
Hudson Bay drainage basin

References 

Lakes of Saskatchewan
Northern Saskatchewan Administration District